Felix Doran may refer to:
 Felix Doran (musician)
 Felix Doran (slave trader)